Curtius may refer to:

People
 Curtia gens, the clan to which the Curtii family belonged
 Marcus Curtius, a noble of early Rome who rode his horse into the Lacus Curtius, which was then named after him
 Quintus Curtius Rufus, 1st century CE historian
 Curtius Rufus. 1st century CE politician, possibly the same as Quintus Curtius Rufus
 Curtius baronets, a title in the Baronetcy of England
 Albert Curtz (1600–1671), German astronomer and member of the Society of Jesus
 Alexander Curtius, Lithuanian nobleman and scholar 
 Alfred Schulz-Curtius (1853–1918), aka Alfred Curtis, a German classical music impresario
 Dirk Donker Curtius (1792–1864), Dutch politician
 Ernst Robert Curtius (1886–1956), German scholar, philologist
 Ernst Curtius (1814–1896), German archaeologist, historian
 Georg Curtius (1820–1885), German philologist
 Jacob Curtius (1554–1594), Imperial Pro-Chancellor for Emperor Rudolph II, astronomer, mathematician and instrument maker
 Janus Henricus Donker Curtius (1813–1879), the last Dutch chief of Dejima, Japan
 Jean Curtius, also known as Jean De Corte and Juan Curcio (1551–1628), an industrialist from Liége
 Curtius Museum, Jean Curtius's mansion, now a museum
 Julius Curtius (1877–1948), German politician
 Ludwig Curtius (1874–1954), archaeologist
 Philippe Curtius (1737–1794), Swiss physician and wax modeller; uncle and teacher of Marie Tussaud
 Theodor Curtius (1857–1928), German chemical scientist
 Sir William Curtius FRS (1599–1678), German magistrate, official resident of the English Crown in the Holy Roman Empire

Other uses
 Curtius (crater), a lunar crater
 Curtius (beer), a Belgian beer
 Curtius, a spring of the Aqua Claudia

See also
 Curti (disambiguation)
 Kurz (disambiguation)
 Kurtz (disambiguation)
 Buchner–Curtius–Schlotterbeck reaction, a chemical reaction
 Curcio, a parish in Lombardy
 Lacus Curtius, an ancient landmark in the Roman Forum
 LacusCurtius, a website specializing in ancient Rome
 Curtius rearrangement, a chemical reaction
 Ernst-Robert-Curtius-Preis, a literary prize of Germany
 Didymoglossum curtii, a species of Didymoglossum
 Pleurothallis curtii, a species of Pleurothallis
 Begonia curtii, a species of Begonia
 Lotononis curtii, a species of ''Lotononis'